Juan Sabas Huertas Lorente (born 13 April 1967) is a Spanish former footballer who played as a forward, currently a manager.

Playing career
After starting out with local teams, Madrid-born Sabas went on to play as a senior for Rayo Vallecano, Atlético Madrid (where he was used mainly as a substitute), Real Betis, CP Mérida, Albacete Balompié, Real Balompédica Linense, Hércules CF and Ciudad de Murcia, starting and finishing his 17-year career with Galáctico Pegaso and retiring at the age of 35.

Sabas appeared in 196 La Liga matches over nine seasons, and scored 34 goals. In Segunda División, he added 82 games and 17 goals.

Coaching career
Sabas returned to Atlético in early 2009 as part of former teammate Abel Resino's coaching staff, having already worked with him in that capacity at Ciudad de Murcia and Levante UD. His first managerial experience occurred with UD San Sebastián de los Reyes during the 2013–14 season, and he later became a director of football at that club. 

On 29 December 2016, Sabas was appointed head coach at Extremadura UD of the third division, but was sacked the following 1 August. He returned to the Estadio Francisco de la Hera on 1 May 2018, helping achieve a first-ever promotion to the second tier; on 10 November, however, he was again dismissed.

Sabas was appointed by Córdoba CF on 10 March 2020, after the dismissal of Raül Agné. On 1 December, after only six matches, he was relieved of his duties.

Managerial statistics

Honours

Player
Atlético Madrid
Copa del Rey: 1990–91, 1991–92

Ciudad de Murcia
Tercera División: 2000–01

References

External links

Betisweb stats and bio 

1967 births
Living people
Footballers from Madrid
Spanish footballers
Association football forwards
La Liga players
Segunda División players
Segunda División B players
Tercera División players
Rayo Vallecano players
Atlético Madrid footballers
Real Betis players
CP Mérida footballers
Albacete Balompié players
Real Balompédica Linense footballers
Hércules CF players
Ciudad de Murcia footballers
Spanish football managers
Segunda División managers
Segunda División B managers
Tercera División managers
Extremadura UD managers
Córdoba CF managers